Ju-Jitsu Federation of the Philippines (abbreviated as JFP) is the national sports association (NSA) for Jujitsu in the Philippines. It was formed in 2015 and represented by 50 jujitsu clubs in the country. Currently, JFP is recognized by the International Brazilian Jiu-Jitsu Federation, the Sport Jiu Jitsu International Federation (SJJIF), the Philippine Sports Commission (PSC) and the Philippine Olympic Committee (POC).

It was admitted as the 50th regular member of the Philippine Olympic Committee in November 2015.

References

External links
Official website

2015 establishments in the Philippines
Brazilian jiu-jitsu organizations
Brazilian Jujitsu